Karel Lamač (27 January 1897 – 2 August 1952) was a Czech film director, actor, screenwriter, producer and singer. He directed more than 100 films in Czechoslovakia, Austria, Germany, the Netherlands and the United Kingdom.

Life 
Lamač was born 27 January 1897 in Prague, Austria-Hungary. His parents were Karel Lamač sr. (1863–1938), opera singer and a pharmacist, and Františka Lamačová (née Prusíková, 1860–1949). In his childhood Lamač was interested in pharmacy, electrical engineering, stage magic and acting. Before WWI he went to apprentice in camera manufacturer company Ernemann in Dresden. During the war he was a combat cameraman. After the war he became a technical director of film laboratory in Excelsiorfilm. He started working in movies in 1918, first as an actor, later as a writer and a director. Among his best movies of this period are crime drama The Poisoned Light, comedy Catch Him! and drama White Paradise. In 1923 he wrote a book How to write a film libretto. His frequent collaborators were actress Anny Ondra, cinematographer Otto Heller and screenwriter Václav Wasserman. In 1926 he co-founded a film studio Kavalírka where he made his movies until it burned down in 1929.

In 1930 he founded a production company Ondra-Lamač Film with his then girlfriend Anny Ondra in Berlin. During 1930s he was making movies in Germany, Czechoslovakia, France and Austria. After the Nazi occupation of Czechoslovakia he left to Netherlands to make De Spooktrein and then to United Kingdom where he joined Czechoslovak Army. He served in RAF until 1941 and in infantry division until 1946. He made war documentaries and three feature movies during WWII.  After the war he made two movies in France. In 1947 then went to USA where he worked on technical innovations of color film and camera lenses. In 1951 he returned to Germany and directed his last film The Thief of Bagdad.

He died in Hamburg, West Germany due to serious problems with his kidneys.

Selected filmography

Director

Actor
 Gilly in Prague for the First Time (1920)
 The Poisoned Light (1921)
 The Arrival from the Darkness (1921)
 Look After Your Daughters (1922)
 Lead Us Not into Temptation (1922)
 Young Medardus (1923)
 Helena (1924)
 The Secret Agent (1924)
 White Paradise (1924)
 The Lantern (1925)
 Eve's Daughters (1928)

Producer
 The Double (1934)

References

External links
 

1897 births
1952 deaths
Male actors from Prague
People from the Kingdom of Bohemia
20th-century Czech male actors
Czech film directors
Czechoslovak film directors
Silent film directors
Czech film producers
Czech male film actors
Czech male silent film actors
Czech screenwriters
Male screenwriters
Silent film screenwriters
German-language film directors
English-language film directors
20th-century screenwriters